|}

The Fillies' Mile is a Group 1 flat horse race in Great Britain open to two-year-old fillies. It is run on the Rowley Mile at Newmarket over a distance of 1 mile (1,609 metres), and it is scheduled to take place each year in October.

History
The event was established in 1973, and it was originally held at Ascot. It was initially sponsored by the Green Shield catalogue shops and titled the Green Shield Stakes. The shops were rebranded as Argos in the mid 1970s, and for a period the race was called the Argos Star Fillies' Mile. It was given Group 3 status in 1975.

The sponsorship was taken over by Hoover in 1978, and the event became known as the Hoover Fillies' Mile. It was promoted to Group 2 level in 1986, and its association with Hoover continued until 1989.

The race was upgraded to Group 1 in 1990, and backed by Brent Walker until 1991. A long-term deal with Meon Valley Stud began in 1998. It was temporarily switched to Newmarket in 2005, when Ascot was closed for redevelopment.

The Fillies' Mile was added to the Breeders' Cup Challenge series in 2008. The winners from 2008 to 2012 earned an automatic invitation to compete in the Breeders' Cup Juvenile Fillies Turf.

The event was transferred to Newmarket in 2011, and from this point it was sponsored by Shadwell. It was formerly held on the second day of the three-day Cambridgeshire Meeting, the day before the Cambridgeshire Handicap but was moved to Future Champions Day from 2014, switching places in the calendar with the Rockfel Stakes. In 2015 the race moved again, to a slightly earlier date in October, and is now run on the Friday of the Future Champions Festival.

Records
Leading jockey (7 wins):
 Frankie Dettori – Shamshir (1990), Glorosia (1997), Teggiano (1999), Crystal Music (2000), White Moonstone (2010), Lyric of Light (2011), Inspiral (2021)

Leading trainer (6 wins): (includes jointly trained horses)
 Henry Cecil – Formulate (1978), Oh So Sharp (1984), Diminuendo (1987), Tessla (1988), Bosra Sham (1995), Reams of Verse (1996)
 John Gosden - Crystal Music (2000), Playful Act (2004), Nannina (2005), Rainbow View (2008), Inspiral (2021), Commissioning (2022)

Leading owner (6 wins): (includes part ownership)
 Sue Magnier / Michael Tabor – Sunspangled (1998), Simply Perfect (2006), Listen (2007), Together Forever (2014), Minding (2015), Rhododendron (2016)

Winners

See also
Horse racing in Great Britain
List of British flat horse races
Road to the Kentucky Oaks

References

 Paris-Turf: 
 Racing Post:

 galopp-sieger.de – Fillies' Mile.
 ifhaonline.org – International Federation of Horseracing Authorities – Fillies' Mile (2019).
 pedigreequery.com – Fillies' Mile.
 

Flat races in Great Britain
Newmarket Racecourse
Flat horse races for two-year-old fillies
Recurring sporting events established in 1973
1973 establishments in England